The following is a list of events and releases that have happened or are expected to happen in 2022 in music in the Philippines.

Notable events
 January 5 – "Bazinga", from the P-pop supergroup SB19, retains its top spot in the Billboard Hot Trending Songs chart, for a fourth week at No. 1.
 February 23 - Sibling groups BGYO and BINI were featured on "Xpedition's cover that made them as the first Filipino celebrities to have a NFT magazine cover and the first ever in the Middle East region launched through the Metaverse.
 March – As COVID-19 restrictions were eased to Alert Level 1 in most parts of the country, live concerts and gigs will return for the first time in 2 years.
 April 25 – Global entertainment company Live Nation launched its Philippine branch with the acquisition of local promotion/organizer Music Management International (MMI).
 May – OPM rock band Callalily officially reformed as Lily following the departure of Kean Cipriano (who now pursues his own musical career and managing indie label O/C Records). The band is now searching for a new vocalist, taking Cipriano's place. 4 months later, it was officially announced that former JBK member and Rak of Aegis musical cast member Joshua Bulot is the new leading vocalist of Lily.
 June 7 – Songs of Apo Hiking Society, Gary Valenciano, Kiana Valenciano, Ryan Cayabyab, Moira Dela Torre, Angela Ken, BGYO and BINI were announced to be part of The Lunar Codex—the first project to send film and music to the moon.
 July 8 – UMG Philippines formally launched Republic Records Philippines, the third imprint label after Def Jam Philippines and Island Records Philippines. Several artists from the UMG Philippines roster including Darren Espanto, Elha Nympha and Zack Tabudlo were joined the new label.
 July:
 Kai Honasan formally announced her departure from indie-alternative band Autotelic, pursuing her resumption as a solo artist.
 Coke Studio Philippines announced its 6th season with a lineup of 6 artists, namely: BINI, Arthur Nery, Adie, KZ Tandingan, Shanti Dope, and The Juans. Each artists will collaborate with 6 individual talented fans who submitted their entries via social media.
 September 5 – BGYO was announced and became the only Filipino act, alongside other 6 K-pop idols, to headline the first ever K-pop Halloween Concert in the Philippines—Hallyuween 2022.
 September 11 – BGYO and H&M Philippines announced the Philippines' first ever concert in a digital universe—BGYO Celestial Spaces: H&M Concert from the Virtual Universe—with a tagline, "where music meets style".
 September 18 – Khimo Gumatay, a 22-year old singer from Makati, was hailed as the grand winner of Idol Philippines season 2.
 September 19 – It was announced by Ely Buendia that the Eraserheads will hold their upcoming reunion concert, entitled "Huling El Bimbo 2022", on December 22, 2022. It will be their first reunion concert since their "The Final Set" concert in 2009. Following the announcement, fans however, concerned about the band's and band members' past issues, including Marcus Adoro's abusive allegations.
 September 20 – Joshua Camacho Bulot was introduced as the newest vocalist of Lily, replacing Kean Cipriano.
 October 12 – Filipino singer-songwriter Adie was among the global rising music acts on Spotify's RADAR, according to Rolling Stone.
 November 4 - Following the release of BGYO's second album Be Us, the group delivered an extraordinary feat of having 2 albums and 32 tracks on iTunes Philippines Charts at the same time, the first Filipino act to do so.
 November 20 – Indie post-rock/math rock band tide/edit announced their disbandment after 11 years, with their final show held in Makati.
 November 25 – Moira Dela Torre officially signed with UMG Philippines label Republic Records Philippines.
 November:
 Actress/singer Lea Salonga collaborates with acapella group Pentatonix for their version of Jose Mari Chan's iconic Christmas song "Christmas in Our Hearts", to be featured in Pentatonix's sixth album Holidays Around the World.
 Indie alternative pop band Banna Harbera announced their disbandment, with their final show held on December 27 at SaGuijo, Makati.
 December
 Kiara San Luis officially departed from Imago as the lead vocalist. Kharren Granada, known as a solo artist performing as Kurei, took over the leading vocals of the said band.
 Zack Tabudlo was held as the Most Streaming Local Artist for Spotify Wrapped of 2022. Meanwhile, "Ikaw Lang", a song by pop-rock band Nobita, was hailed as the Most Streaming Local Track of 2022.

Debuting acts

Bands

Solo artists

Reunion/Comebacks
 Chelsea Ronquillo
 Perkins (formerly Perkins Twins)
 O.C. Dawgs
 Rivermaya
 Run Dorothy
 Shamrock

Disbanded
 JBK
 tide/edit
 Banna Harbera

On hiatus

Released in 2022

First quarter

January

February

March

Second quarter

April

May

June

Third quarter

July

August

September

Fourth quarter

October

November

December

Concerts and music festivals

Most of the shows this year were supposed to be held in 2020, but postponed due to the COVID-19 pandemic. Some concerts may be held in mid-late 2022 or postponed in 2023 depending on safety conditions related to the ongoing coronavirus.

Local artists

International artists

Virtual concerts

Music festivals

Canceled/postponed dates

Deaths
 January 23 – Romano Vasquez (b. 1971), former actor and singer
 February 21 – Jomer "OG Kaybee" Galicia (b. 1988), rapper
 March 22 – Eva Castillo (b. 1969), singer
 March 29 – Jun Lopito (b. 1958), guitarist
 April 7 – Carlos Salazar (b. 1930), actor and singer
 October 3 – Mon Legaspi (b. 1968), bassist for The Dawn and Wolfgang
 October 31 – Danny Javier (b. 1947), singer-songwriter and member of APO Hiking Society
 December 1 – Sylvia La Torre (b. 1933), singer and actress
 December 9 – Jovit Baldivino (b. 1993), singer

Notes

References

Philippines
2022 in the Philippines
Philippine music industry